Lamegoia is an extinct genus of mammals, belonging to the family Didolodontidae. It contains a single species, Lamegoia conodonta, which lived during the Late Paleocene in what is now South America.

Description

This animal is only known from a few fossil teeth, and reconstructing its appearance is therefore impossible. From comparison with some of his relatives, it is assumed it may have been 75 centimeters long. Lamegoia was characterized by bunodont teeth, quite similar to Didolodus but more archaic ; the lower molars possessed a complete trigonid.

Classification

Lamegoia is a member of the Didolodontidae, a badly known clade of south-american mammals from the early Cenozoic. Lamegoia conodonta was described in 1952 by Carlos de Paula Couto, over fossilized teeth found near São José de Itaborai in Brazil.

Paleobiology

Lamegoia possessed transversal and highly wavy Hunter-Schreger bands (structures present on the teeth, used for strengthening the enamel ; other mammals of similar size from the Itaboraí Formation possessed vertical bands. It is supposed that this characteristic was a functional adaptation to a certain type of vegetation, that the bunodont dentition of Lamegoia was able to process.

References

C. d. Paula Couto. 1952. Fossil mammals from the beginning of the Cenozoic in Brazil. Condylarthra, Litopterna, Xenungulata, and Astrapotheria. Bulletin of the American Museum of Natural History 99(6):355-394
R. Cifelli. 1983. The origin and affinities of the South American Condylarthra and early Tertiary Litopterna (Mammalia). American Museum Novitates 2772:1-49
J. N. Gelfo. 2007. The ‘condylarth’ Raulvaccia peligrensis (Mammalia: Didolodontidae) from the Paleocene of Patagonia, Argentina. Journal of Vertebrate Paleontology 27(3):651-660

Didolodontids
Condylarths
Paleocene mammals of South America
Paleogene Argentina
Fossils of Brazil
Fossil taxa described in 1952
Prehistoric placental genera
Monotypic mammal genera
Itaboraí Formation